Frechen (Ripuarian: Frechem) is a town in the Rhein-Erft District, North Rhine-Westphalia, Germany. Frechen was first mentioned in 877. It is situated at the western Cologne city border.

It is the site of the 1257 Battle of Frechen between Conrad von Hochstaden, Archbishop of Cologne and the people of the town. In the 16th century it acquired a name for its terra cotta artifacts, especially the "Bartmannskrug" (beardman jug). In the late 18th century lignite was industrially mined. Digging for lignite dominated the city's economy until the end of the 20th century. In 1891 the first briquette factory was opened. On 2 September 1951 Frechen received its city-rights including the villages of Bachem, Hücheln and Buschbell. On 1 January 1975 the nearby villages of Grefrath, Habbelrath, Königsdorf and Neufreimersdorf were also incorporated. From the 1980s onwards an increasing number of industrial, commercial and service enterprises choose Frechen as their location, so that the town changed its features considerably.

Population

As of December 31, 2015 there were 51,999 inhabitants registered.

Local council

Elections were held in September 2020.
 CDU:                     19 seats
 SPD:                     11 seats
 Alliance 90/The Greens:  9 seats
 Perspektive für Frechen: 4 seats
 FDP:                     3 seats
 The Left:                2 seats
 Alternative für Deutschland:                2 seats

Notable people
 Kirsten Bolm (born 1975), athlete
 Wayne Carpendale (born 1977), actor and presenter
 Pierre Vogel (born 1978), Islamist preacher
 Ayọ (born 1980), soul singer
 Sonja Bertram (born 1984), actress
 Marcel Heller (born 1986), footballer
 Lennart Thy (born 1992), footballer

Twin towns – sister cities

Frechen is twinned with:
 Kapfenberg, Austria

References

External links

Official website

Towns in North Rhine-Westphalia
Rhein-Erft-Kreis